Living organisms are known by scientific names. These binomial names can vary greatly in length, and some of them can become very long depending on the meanings they try to convey. This list of longest species names lists the longest scientific binomials.
Species in this list are grouped by length of their name. Only binomials are considered, not subgenera, trinomial names of subspecies or infraspecific names. Family is given for each species (or the closest taxonomic rank if family is unassigned), with a short explanation.  The shortest scientific species names can be found in the List of short species names.

73 letters

50 letters

44 letters

42 letters

40 letters

39 letters

38 letters

37 letters

36 letters

35 letters

References

Taxonomic lists